Sigrid Rondelez (born 17 March 1971 in Bruges) is a Belgian windsurfer, who specialized in Mistral and Neil Pryde RS:X classes. She represented Belgium in three editions of the Olympic Games (2000, 2004, and 2012), and was a top eight finalist at the 2003 ISAF Sailing World Championships in Cadiz, Spain. Before her sporting career ended in 2012, Rondelez trained for Side Shore Surfers Club in De Panne under her head coach, former Dutch windsurfer, and 2008 Olympian Casper Bouman.

Rondelez made her official debut at the 2000 Summer Olympics in Sydney, where she placed sixteenth in women's Mistral sailboard with a net score of 127 points. At the 2004 Summer Olympics in Athens, Rondelez competed again in the same program after finishing eighth from the World Championships in Cadiz. She posted a grade of 148 net points to end the eleven-race opening series with an eighteenth-place finish.

Eight years after competing in her last Olympics, Rondelez qualified for her third Belgian team, as a 36-year-old, in the RS:X class at the 2012 Summer Olympics in London by receiving a berth from the ISAF Sailing World Championships in Perth, Western Australia. Rondelez missed a chance to sail in the medal race with a seventeenth-place finish after ten opening rounds, accumulating a net score of 150 points.

References

External links
  
 
 
 
 

1971 births
Living people
Belgian female sailors (sport)
Belgian windsurfers
Olympic sailors of Belgium
Sailors at the 2000 Summer Olympics – Mistral One Design
Sailors at the 2004 Summer Olympics – Mistral One Design
Sailors at the 2012 Summer Olympics – RS:X
Sportspeople from Bruges
21st-century Belgian women
Female windsurfers